Nganukonharengak is a settlement in Kenya's Turkana County.

References 

Populated places in Turkana County